Peter McIntyre may refer to:

Peter McIntyre (artist) (1910–1995), official New Zealand war artist during the Second World War
Peter McIntyre (cricketer) (born 1966), former Australian cricketer
Peter McIntyre (Australian footballer) (born 1967), former Australian rules footballer
Peter McIntyre (footballer, born 1875), (1875–1938) Scottish footballer
Peter McIntyre (architect) (born 1927), Australian architect and educator
Peter McIntyre (bishop) (1818–1891), bishop of the Roman Catholic Diocese of Charlottetown
Peter McIntyre (Manitoba politician) (1854–1930), postmaster and politician in Manitoba, Canada

 Peter Adolphus McIntyre (1840–1910), Canadian politician
 Peter McIntyre (judge), Canadian judge